The 639th Aircraft Control and Warning Squadron is an inactive United States Air Force unit. It was last assigned to the Sault Sainte Marie Air Defense Sector, Air Defense Command, stationed at Lowther Air Station, Ontario, Canada. It was inactivated on 1 July 1963.

The unit was a general surveillance radar squadron providing for the air defense of North America.

Lineage
 Activated as 639th Aircraft Control and Warning Squadron, 1 December 1956
 Inactivated on 1 July 1963

Assignments
 37th Air Division, 1 December 1956
 30th Air Division, 1 April 1959
 Sault Sainte Marie Air Defense Sector, 1 April 1960 – 1 July 1963

Stations
 Truax Field, Wisconsin, 1 December 1956
 Lowther Air Station, 1 July 1957 – 1 July 1963

References

  Cornett, Lloyd H. and Johnson, Mildred W., A Handbook of Aerospace Defense Organization  1946 - 1980, Office of History, Aerospace Defense Center, Peterson AFB, CO (1980)

External links

Radar squadrons of the United States Air Force
Aerospace Defense Command units